Zachariah Matthews, a Sydney Muslim educator and community advocate, was born in Bosmont Johannesburg and attended Chris Jan Botha Senior Secondary School CJB, South Africa, where he studied Qur'an and Islamic studies as well as secular subjects. Matthews' secular education was in Pharmacy, in which
he completed B.Pharm, BSc (Hon) and Pharm.D degrees in South Africa and the United States before migrating to Australia, where he now lives. He has also completed a Master of Islamic Studies in Australia.

Matthews has appeared at a number of Islamic forums and conferences, published several papers and given media interviews on Islamic topics. He works actively with Australian youth, and is involved with/on the board of several community-based and national organizations and has contributed to various civic initiatives.
Notably, he has helped to co-ordinate national statements in regard to the Australian government’s Muslim Community Reference Group, the pro-hijab campaign and others.

Matthews has lectured part-time for several years at the University of Sydney and was a former director of pharmacy at Canterbury Hospital, Sydney, NSW Australia.

For two years he was Head of Religious and Leadership Studies at an independent school. Dr Matthews actively focusses on leadership mentoring and development. He writes and publishes on subjects ranging from the ethics of disagreement to spirituality in the post-modern world. He is currently the principal of an independent western Sydney school*.

He previously served as the president of the Australian Islamic Mission (AIM) and was a board member of the Australian Muslim Civil Rights & Advocacy Network (AMCRAN).

Matthews is the director of Just Media Advocacy and instructor with Deen Academy.

Education and community work

Studied Quran Reading and Memorisation for seven years part-time (South Africa), 1975-1981.
Islamic Studies Course for 2.5 years part-time (South Africa), 1986-1988.
MSA High School Student Affairs coordinator (South Africa)1985-1986.
B. Pharm (Wits University, South Africa), 1986.
BSc, Hons (Pharmacology), Potchefstroom University South Africa, 1988.
MSA Exco member, Ohio State University, USA, 1989-1990.
Editor, MSA News, Columbus, USA (monthly), 1988-89.
Pharm.D, OSU, USA, 1990.
Migrated to Australia 1990.
FAMSY Exco and National President, 1991-1997.
Editor, SALAM Magazine, 10 years, 1995-2004.
FAMSY Tarbiyyah coordinator/assistant, 1995 to 2006.
AFIC Exco Member, 3 years, 1997-1999.
Editor, Australian Muslim News, 3 years, 1997-1999.
Editor, Muslim Business Network magazine, Sydney (quarterly), 1 year, 1998.
Australian Islamic Mission President, 2003 to 2011.
Board Member, Australian Muslim Civil Rights & Advocacy Network (AMCRAN), 2007–2011.
Director Just Media Advocacy, 2011–present.
Instructor, Deen Academy, 2012–present
Master of Islamic Studies, 2016

Papers and Presentations

Current Muslim trends impacting adversely on Australia 
Zachariah Matthews responds to media allegations about sharia, deception, etc. 
Islamic community fosters understanding in Wagga, 17 November 2014,

Sources 
Guide to Islamic Practices For Police Services written by Dr. Matthews
Islam in Australia article written by Dr. Matthews
Australian Muslim Civil Rights Advocacy Network - Muslim Civil Rights Group concerned about new anti-terror law proposals 
The Federation of Australian Muslim Students and Youth - 2009 Sirah Tour
Australian Islamic Mission (AIM)
Mission of Hope Event
The Sydney Morning Herald - Muslims Object to New Powers
The Sydney Morning Herald - The thin, blue Islamic line
Health Australia Document in which Dr. Matthews is listed as Chief Pharmacist at Cantebury Hospital

External links
Bio on Mercy Mission Australia website
Zachariah Matthews lectures from Muslim Talks
 Just Media Advocacy Website

Living people
Australian Sunni Muslims
South African Sunni Muslims
People from Sydney
Australian Muslims
Year of birth missing (living people)